Whitewash is a 1994 television special and animated short film that was based on a true story. The program was produced and directed by Michael Sporn with a screenplay by Ntozake Shange. Ruby Dee and Linda Lavin provide voices for the animated characters.

Plot 
The family special, based on a true story, uses animation to tell the story of a little African-American girl's encounter with mindless racism. On their way home from school, Helene and her brother are attacked by a group of white thugs who beat him up and spray-paint her face white. Why would anyone do this? With her wise grandmother's help, Helene is able to get over her hurt.

References

External links 

Ntozake Shange Papers, 1966-2016; Barnard Archives and Special Collections, Barnard Library, Barnard College.

Animated television specials
1994 films
1994 television specials
American television films
Films about racism
Films set in the Bronx
American animated short films
First Run Features films
1990s American films